Sadeqabad-e Qapanuri (also Romanized as Şādeqābād-e Qapānūrī; also known as Chūlak-e Şādeqābād) is a village in Tariq ol Eslam Rural District, in the Central District of Nahavand County, Hamadan Province, Iran. At the 2006 census, its population was 594, in 164 families.

References 

Populated places in Nahavand County